Jerome F. Luebbers (born 1946) was a member of the Ohio House of Representatives, serving from 1979 until 2000.  Initially winning election against Norman Murdock in 1978, he went on to serve for eleven terms in the House. Term limits forced him out in 2000, and he was succeeded by future Congressman Steve Driehaus in 2001.

References

1946 births
Democratic Party members of the Ohio House of Representatives
Living people